Alan William Cox (4 September 1920 – 1993) was an English footballer, who played as a winger in the Football League for Tranmere Rovers.

References

External links

Tranmere Rovers F.C. players
Association football wingers
English Football League players
1920 births
1993 deaths
English footballers